is the remains of a castle structure in Akitakata, Hiroshima Prefecture, Japan.

In 1500, Mōri Motonari's father Mōri Hiromoto moved from Yoshida-Kōriyama Castle to the castle and lived a retired life. Motonari spent 23 years in the castle before returning to Yoshida-Kōriyama castle as a head of Mōri clan. Motonari's son Mōri Takamoto was born in the castle in 1523.

Tajihi-Sarugake castle survived as a supporting castle of Yoshida-Kōriyama castle even after Motonari left but it is believed the castle was abandoned when Mōri Terumoto moved clan's main bastion to Hiroshima castle in 1591.
Its ruins have been protected as a National Historic Site, since 1940.

See also
List of Historic Sites of Japan (Hiroshima)

References

Castles in Hiroshima Prefecture
Historic Sites of Japan
Former castles in Japan
Mōri clan
Ruined castles in Japan